A  list of the most recent films produced in Azerbaijan ordered by year of release in the 2000s (decade):

2000s

External links
 Azerbaijani film at the Internet Movie Database
 Azerbaycan Kinosu

2000
Aezerb
Films